Harihokake Creek (once known as Cakceahocake Creek) is a  tributary of the Delaware River in Hunterdon County, New Jersey in the United States.

The headwaters of the Harihokake begin at from springs in the Musconetcong Mountains in Alexandria Township. On the
way south it passes through Mount Pleasant before joining the Delaware just above Nishisakawick Creek in Frenchtown.

See also
List of rivers of New Jersey

References

External links
 U.S. Geological Survey: NJ stream gaging stations

Tributaries of the Delaware River
Rivers of Hunterdon County, New Jersey
Rivers of New Jersey